The 2008–09 Israeli Hockey League season was the 18th season of Israel's hockey league. HC Herzliya won their first Israeli championship.

External links
 List of Israeli champions on hockeyarenas.net

Israeli League
Israeli League (ice hockey) seasons
Seasons